Kampala International University (KIU) is a private, not-for-profit institution based in Uganda. It was established in 2001 and assumed chartered status in 2009.

In pursuit of the dream to raise the next generation of problem solvers for the East African region and indeed the whole of Africa, the University operates a multi-campus system which consists of two campuses in Uganda (The Main campus in Kampala and the Western Campus in Ishaka-Bushenyi); one other university in Dar Es Salaam, Tanzania, while a third one is being developed in Nairobi Kenya. The University which started as a typical degree-awarding institution has now grown into the number one Private University in Uganda and is currently ranked number 2 in the country according to the 2022 Webometric Ranking, out of 68 universities. It is a member of the Association of Commonwealth Universities, the Association of Africa Universities as well as the Inter University-Council of East Africa. The University offers a variety of programmes in Health Sciences, Science and Technology, Engineering, Business and Management, Law, Humanities and Education.

Location
KIU has its main campus at Kansanga, a location in Makindye Division in the south-eastern part of Kampala, Uganda's capital and largest city. The coordinates of the campus are 0°17'41.0"N, 32°36'13.0"E (Latitude:0.294722; Longitude:32.603611).

KIU maintains a third campus, the KIU Dar es Salaam Constituent College, in Dar es Salaam, Tanzania.

History
Kampala International University (KIU) is a private, not-for-profit institution based in Uganda. It was established in 2001 and received its university charter in March 2009.

University Management

Executive
The University Executive consists of

The Vice-Chancellor, Mouhammad Mpezamihigo
Deputy Vice Chancellor, Finance and Administration, Janice Desire Busingye
Deputy Vice Chancellor, KIU Western Campus, Patrick Kyamanywa
Deputy Vice Chancellor, Research Innovations Consultancy and Extensions, Chukwuemeka Jude Diji

Academic colleges, schools, and institutes

Main campus

KIU's main campus has three constituent colleges and three schools and one directorate

 KIU College of Education
 College of Humanities
 College of Economics and Management
 School of Law
 School of Computing and Information Technology
 School of Humanities
 Directorate of Higher Degrees and Research

This is the largest of the three campuses, hosting more than 7,000 students and over 300 academic staff.

Western campus

The Western Campus in Ishaka has 4 schools and 1 faculty

 School of Engineering and Applied Sciences 
 School of Allied Health Sciences
 School of Biomedical Sciences
 School of Nursing Sciences
 Faculty of Clinical Medicine and Dentistry

This campus houses over 5,000 students supervised by over 200 academic staff.

Certificate, diploma, undergraduate, and postgraduate programs are offered at this campus. It is predominantly a science-based institution.

The School of Health Sciences is located on the western campus. The school is one of Uganda's seven medical schools, and it was the first privately owned medical school in the country. The school offers programmes in medicine, dentistry, nursing, medical laboratory technology, education, business, and management and information technology. The school has a teaching hospital with a bed capacity of 1,200.

Dar es Salaam campus

2013 government investigation

In 2013, the Ugandan National Council for Higher Education (NCHE) began an investigation into whether the 42 Doctorates of Philosophy (PhDs) awarded by KIU up to that time had met NCHE's requirements. At the end of the investigation in November 2013, NCHE declared that the PhDs were legitimate.

See also
 Education in Uganda
 List of universities in Uganda
 List of university leaders in Uganda
 List of medical schools in Uganda
 List of business schools in Uganda

References

External links
 Kampala International University Homepage
 Kampala International University In Tanzania
  Know Your Hood : Kansanga, This Sprawling Neighbourhood Is The Hub For University Students
 Photo of KIU Western Campus Main Building

Kampala International University
Educational institutions established in 2001
2001 establishments in Uganda
Education in Kampala
Makindye Division